This is a list of aircraft used by Portugal in World War II who never fought in World War II but from 1944 cooperated with the allies in a non-belligerent capacity giving access to Portuguese territorial possessions for allied forces. Most World War II Portuguese aircraft were confiscated from allied forces. A number of allied aircraft on their way to the North African campaign were forced to land in Portugal due to problems with the aircraft, after which they were confiscated by Portuguese authorities on grounds that it was illegal for the allied aircraft to land in Portugal due to Portugal's neutrality. Portugal incorporated the confiscated aircraft into the Força Aérea Portuguesa (Portuguese Air Force).

Fighters

Bombers

Ground attack aircraft

Maritime patrol aircraft 

 Grumman G-21B Goose
Short Sunderland-only 1 which did 1 mission

Liaison/army cooperation 

 Westland Lysander

Transport 

 Junkers Ju 52
 Douglas C-47 Skytrain-only one

Trainers 

 Morane-Saulnier MS.230
 De Havilland Tiger Moth
 Airspeed Oxford

See also
 List of Portuguese military equipment of World War II
 List of aircraft of World War II

References

Portugal in World War II
Portugal
World War II